Sir John Lavery  (20 March 1856 – 10 January 1941) was an Irish painter best known for his portraits and wartime depictions.

Life and career

John Lavery was born in inner North Belfast, baptised at St Patrick's Church, Belfast and, while still a child, moved to Scotland where he attended Haldane Academy in Glasgow in the 1870s. In 1878 he set up his own studio which was razed in a fire in the following year. With a £300 insurance pay-out he spent a year studying at Heatherley's School in London. Lavery continued his studies at the Académie Julian in Paris in the early 1880s. He returned to Glasgow and was associated with the Glasgow School. William Burrell, a wealthy shipowner, was a faithful patron of Scottish artists including Joseph Crawhall II, with whom Lavery studied. In 1888 he was commissioned to paint the state visit of Queen Victoria to the Glasgow International Exhibition. This launched his career as a society painter and he moved to London soon after. In 1896, William Burrell commissioned Lavery to paint a portrait of his sister Mary Burrell. This portrait was exhibited widely and is considered one of Lavery's finest works. Another portrait of Mrs. Burrell was altered to become the "Red Rose" portrait of Hazel Lavery.  In his memoir, Lavery acknowledged Burrell's patronage. In London, he became friendly with James McNeill Whistler and was clearly influenced by him.

Like William Orpen, Lavery was appointed an official artist in the First World War. Ill health, however, prevented him from travelling to the Western Front. A serious car crash during a Zeppelin bombing raid also kept him from fulfilling this role as war artist. He remained in Britain and mostly painted boats, aeroplanes and airships. During the war years he was a close friend of the Asquith family and spent time with them at their Sutton Courtenay Thames-side residence, painting their portraits and idyllic pictures like Summer on the River (Hugh Lane Gallery).

After the war he was knighted and in 1921 he was elected to the Royal Academy. His work was also part of the art competitions at the 1924 Summer Olympics, the 1928 Summer Olympics, and the 1932 Summer Olympics.

During this time, he and his wife, Hazel, were tangentially involved in the Irish War of Independence and the Irish Civil War. They gave the use of their London home to the Irish negotiators during the negotiations leading to the Anglo-Irish Treaty. After Michael Collins was assassinated, Lavery painted Michael Collins, Love of Ireland, now in the Hugh Lane Municipal Gallery in Dublin. In 1929, Lavery made substantial donations of his work to both The Ulster Museum and the Hugh Lane Municipal Gallery and in the 1930s he returned to Ireland. He received honorary degrees from the University of Dublin and Queen's University Belfast. He was also made a freeman of both Dublin and Belfast. A long-standing member of Glasgow Art Club, Lavery exhibited at the club's annual exhibitions, including its exhibition in 1939 in which his The Lake at Ranelagh was included.

Personal life

Lavery was an orphan raised by relatives in Moira, Co.Down.
Lavery's first wife, Kathleen MacDermott, whom he married in 1889, died of tuberculosis in 1891, shortly after the birth of their daughter, Eileen (later Lady Sempill, 1890–1935).

In 1909 Lavery remarried, to Hazel Martyn (1886–1935), an Irish-American known for her beauty and poise, who had a daughter, Alice Trudeau (Mrs. Jack McEnery). Hazel Lavery was depicted in more than 400 of her husband's paintings.
The sumptuous The Artist's Studio: Lady Lavery with her Daughter Alice and Step-Daughter Eileen, currently is in the National Gallery of Ireland.

Hazel Lavery modelled for the allegorical figure of Ireland he painted on commission from the Irish government, reproduced on Irish banknotes from 1928 until 1975 and then as a watermark until the introduction of the Euro in 2002. The Laverys' marriage was tempestuous, and Lady Lavery reportedly was unfaithful.

Sir John Lavery died in Rossenarra House, Kilmoganny, Co. Kilkenny on 10 January 1941, aged 84, from natural causes, and was interred in Putney Vale Cemetery.

Works in collections

Aberdeen Art Gallery
Birmingham Museum & Art Gallery
The Cecil Higgins Art Gallery
The Crawford Municipal Art Gallery, Cork, including:
The Red Rose (1923)
The Guildhall Art Gallery, London
The Hugh Lane Municipal Gallery, Dublin, including:
 Sutton Courtenay, (Summer on the River or The Wharf) (1917)
Japanese Switzerland
The Imperial War Museum
The Irish Museum of Modern Art (IMMA)
Miss Flora Lion in Her Oriental Costume Deaccessioned 2000
The Laing Art Gallery
The National Gallery of Ireland, Dublin
Rothe House, Kilkenny
National Museum of Serbia, Belgrade
The Tate Gallery, London, including:
The Glasgow Exhibition 1888 (1888)
The Chess Players (1929)
The Ulster Museum, Belfast
The Walker Art Gallery

See also

List of Irish artists
List of Orientalist artists
Orientalism
Anna Pavlova

References

Further reading

 Sinéad McCoole, "Hazel: A Life of Lady Lavery, 1880–1935", Lilliput Press, 1997. 
 Anne Millar Stewart (2003), "Lavery, Sir John" in Brian Lalor (Ed.) The Encyclopedia of Ireland. Dublin: Gill & Macmillan. 
 Sinéad McCoole (2003), "Lavery, Hazel, Lady" in Brian Lalor (Ed.) The Encyclopedia of Ireland. Dublin: Gill & Macmillan.

External links

 
Biography
John Lavery at artcyclopedia.com
John Lavery at the JSS Virtual Gallery
A Restaurant dedicated to Sir John Lavery.
Sir John Lavery Biography
John Lavery, The Life of a Painter (1940 autobiography).
Images from his autobiography The Life of a Painter (at YouTube.com)

1856 births
1941 deaths
19th-century Irish painters
20th-century Irish painters
Irish knights
Irish male painters
Académie Julian alumni
Alumni of the Heatherley School of Fine Art
Artists from Belfast
British people of World War I
Burials at Putney Vale Cemetery
Glasgow School
Irish Impressionist painters
Knights Bachelor
Painters from Northern Ireland
Irish portrait painters
Royal Academicians
Olympic competitors in art competitions
Members of the Royal Ulster Academy